"Bleed Red" is a song written by Tommy Lee James and Andrew Dorff, and recorded by American country music singer Ronnie Dunn.  The song is Dunn's first solo release after Brooks & Dunn disbanded in 2010. "Bleed Red" was released to country radio on January 31, 2011. It is intended to be the lead-off single from Dunn's first solo album, Ronnie Dunn. He had previously released three singles: "It's Written All Over Your Face", "She Put the Sad in All His Songs", and "Jessie"; with the first two singles charting to number 59 on the U.S. Billboard Hot Country Singles & Tracks (now Hot Country Songs) chart.

Reception

Critical
Matt Bjorke of Roughstock reviewed the song and gave it a "4-star" rating. Bjorke stated he thought the song was a "power ballad with a message on inclusiveness and forgiveness." He also continued saying the production could have been toned down a notch.

Commercial
"Bleed Red" was released to country radio on January 31, 2011. It then debuted at number 30 on the U.S. Billboard Hot Country Songs chart for the chart week ending February 19, 2011. Its debut position matches the highest debut ever made by a Brooks & Dunn single, as "My Maria" also debuted at number 30 in 1996. In its second chart week, it debuted at number 99 on the U.S. Billboard Hot 100. It also debuted at number 99 on the Canadian Hot 100 chart for the week of March 5, 2011. It peaked at number 10 on the country chart in May 2011.

Music video
The music video was directed by Thien Phan and premiered in April 2011.

Chart performance

Year-end charts

References

2011 singles
Ronnie Dunn songs
Songs written by Tommy Lee James
Songs written by Andrew Dorff
Arista Nashville singles
2011 songs